Hakluyt Island is an island in Baffin Bay, in Avannaata municipality, off northwest Greenland.

Geography
Hakluyt Island lies off the western shore of Kiatak (Northumberland Island). It is part of a small group of coastal islands formed by Kiatak, Herbert Island and Hakluyt Island, Hakluyt being the smallest of the three. Aligned from east to west, the islands lie off the Inglefield Fjord, between the Murchison Sound to the north and the Hvalsund to the south.

See also
List of islands of Greenland

References

Islands of Greenland
Avannaata

sv:Hakluyt Ø